The National Resources Inventory (NRI) is a periodic assessment of the status and changing conditions of the soil, water, and related resources on private land conducted by USDA’s Natural Resources Conservation Service (NRCS). The survey has been conducted at 5-year intervals since 1977, most recently in 2007, though a 2010 mid-cycle data release occurred in December 2013. NRCS released initial results from the 1997 survey in late 1999. The 2010 report includes comparison of the data relative to 1982.

Summary pages exist for soil erosion, land use status and trends, development of non-federal rural land, and rangeland.

External links
 NRI website (contains results from the 2010 survey, as well as archived results from 1997.

References 
 

United States Department of Agriculture
Environmental conservation
Natural resource management